The First cabinet of Davíð Oddsson in Iceland was formed 30 April 1991.

Cabinets

Inaugural cabinet: 30 April 1991 – 14 June 1993

First reshuffle: 14 June 1993 – 24 June 1994
Guðmundur Árni Stefánsson replaced Sighvatur Kristinn Björgvinsson as Minister of Health and Social Security. Össur Skarphéðinsson replaced Eiður Svanberg Guðnason as Minister for the Environment. Sighvatur Kristinn Björgvinsson replaced Jón Sigurðsson as Minister of Commerce and Minister of Industry.

Second reshuffle: 24 June 1994 – 12 November 1994
Guðmundur Árni Stefánsson replaced Jóhanna Sigurðardóttir as Minister of Social Affairs. Sighvatur Kristinn Björgvinsson replaced Guðmundur Árni Stefánsson as Minister of Health and Social Security.

Third reshuffle: 12 November 1994 – 23 April 1995
Rannveig Guðmundsdóttir replaced Guðmundur Árni Stefánsson as Minister of Social Affairs.

See also
Government of Iceland
Cabinet of Iceland

References

David Oddsson, First cabinet of
David Oddsson, First cabinet of
David Oddsson, First cabinet of
Cabinets established in 1991
Cabinets disestablished in 1995
Independence Party (Iceland)